Tropidia incerta is a species of hoverfly in the family Syrphidae.

Distribution
Madagascar.

References

Eristalinae
Diptera of Africa
Insects described in 1971